James Cancellar (fl. 1564), was an English theological writer. Cancellar describes himself as ‘one of the Queen's Majesty's most hon. chapel’ at the beginning of Mary's reign. Probably he was the James Cancellar who, on 27 July 1554, was admitted as proctor for Hugh Barret, priest, to the mastership of the Hospital of Poor Priests at Canterbury.

His works are:
, London [1553], 8vo; dedicated to Queen Mary.
, London, 1553, 8vo.
, London, 1558, 8vo.
Meditations set forth after the alphabet of the Queens name. Dedicated to Queen Elizabeth. Printed at the end of the translation by Queen Elizabeth of the ‘Meditation’ of Margaret, queen of Navarre, London (H. Denham), 24mo.
An Alphabet of Prayers, London, 1564, 1576, 16mo. In this alphabet ‘many prayers have the first letter of them in alphabetical order; and the initial letter of others form his patron's name, Robert Dudley.’

References

16th-century English writers
16th-century male writers
Religious writers
English male writers